Ronald Guy (3 November 1912 – 4 August 2005) was a British sports shooter. He competed in the 50 m pistol event at the 1952 Summer Olympics.

References

External links
 

1912 births
2005 deaths
British male sport shooters
Olympic shooters of Great Britain
Shooters at the 1952 Summer Olympics
Sportspeople from Oxford